Vaughn Wilton Monroe (October 7, 1911 – May 21, 1973) was an American baritone singer, trumpeter, big band leader, and businessman, who was most popular in the 1940s and 1950s. He has two stars on the Hollywood Walk of Fame, one for recording and another for radio performance.

Early life
Monroe was born in Akron, Ohio, United States. He graduated from Jeannette High School in Pennsylvania in 1929, where he was senior class president and voted "Most Likely to Succeed". After graduation, he attended Carnegie Institute of Technology, where he was an active member of the Sigma Nu fraternity. Monroe attended New England Conservatory for one semester in 1935, studying voice with Clarence B. Shirley.

Career
Monroe formed his first orchestra in Boston in 1940 and became its principal vocalist. He began recording for RCA Victor's subsidiary Bluebird label. That same year, Monroe built The Meadows, a restaurant and nightclub to the west of Boston on Massachusetts Route 9 in Framingham, Massachusetts. After he ceased performing, he continued running the club until his death in 1973.

The summer of 1942 brought a 13-week engagement on radio, as Monroe and his orchestra had a summer replacement program for Blondie on CBS.

Monroe hosted the Camel Caravan radio program from The Meadows, starting in 1946 and, during this time, was featured in a Camel cigarettes commercial. In 1952, Monroe and his orchestra had a weekly program on Saturday nights on NBC radio. Those programs originated on location from wherever the band happened to be touring. Each program featured a focus on a college in the United States.

The Meadows burned to the ground in December 1980 after sitting shuttered and vacant for a number of years.

Monroe was tall and handsome, which helped him as a band leader and singer, as well as in Hollywood. He was sometimes called "the Baritone with Muscles", "the Voice with Hair on its Chest", "Ol' Leather Tonsils", or "Leather Lungs".

Monroe recorded extensively for RCA Victor until 1956, and his signature tune was "Racing With the Moon" (1941). It sold more than one million copies by 1952, becoming Monroe's first million-seller, and was awarded a gold disc by the RIAA. Among his other hits were "In the Still of the Night" (1939), "There I Go" (1941), "There I've Said It Again" (1945), "Let It Snow, Let It Snow, Let It Snow" (1946), "Ballerina" (1947), "Melody Time" (1948), "Riders in the Sky" (1949), "Someday (You'll Want Me To Want You)" (1949), "Sound Off" (1951), and "In the Middle of the House" (1956). He also turned down the chance to record "Rudolph the Red-Nosed Reindeer".

Monroe's orchestra had a number of excellent musicians including future jazz guitar great Bucky Pizzarelli. While their musical focus was largely romantic ballads, in person, the band had a fiercely swinging side only occasionally captured on record. In ballrooms, Monroe often reserved the final set of the evening for unrestrained, swinging music.

Movies also beckoned, although he did not pursue it with vigor. Monroe appeared in Meet the People (1944), Carnegie Hall (1947), Singing Guns (1950), and Toughest Man in Arizona (1952). He co-authored The Adventures of Mr. Putt Putt (1949), a children's book about airplanes and flying, a personal interest of his. 

He hosted The Vaughn Monroe Show on CBS Television (1950–51, 1954–55) and appeared on Bonanza, The Mike Douglas Show, The Ed Sullivan Show, Texaco Star Theatre, The Jackie Gleason Show, The Tonight Show Starring Johnny Carson, and American Bandstand. He was a major stockholder in RCA and appeared in print ads and television commercials for the company's television and audio products.

After leaving the performing end of show business, he remained with RCA for many years as a television spokesperson, executive, and talent scout. In the latter capacity, he helped give Neil Sedaka, among others, his first major exposure. He was awarded two stars on the Hollywood Walk of Fame, one for recording at 1600 Vine Street and one for radio at 1755 Vine Street in Hollywood, California.

Personal life
Monroe married Marian Baughman on April 2, 1940, in Jeannette, Pennsylvania, where they had met as high school students. They did not date during high school, but became romantically inclined toward each other when their paths crossed again in New York City, years after graduation. They returned to Jeannette for their wedding. They had two children, Candace (born 1941) and Christina (born 1944). They remained married until Vaughn's death in 1973.

Monroe was an avid railroad enthusiast. He collected and built HO scale model trains.  On concert tours he had an elaborate and compact workshop that folded neatly into a valise.  Inside were hundreds of intricate tools to build operating miniature locomotives, passenger & freight cars.

Monroe was a licensed pilot and often flew his own Lockheed 12A airplane to tour dates.

Death
Monroe died on May 21, 1973, at Martin County Memorial Hospital in Florida, shortly after having stomach surgery for a bleeding ulcer. He was buried in Fernhill Memorial Gardens and Mausoleum in Stuart, Florida.

Monroe Orchestra personnel 

 Moonmaids, a female vocal quartet (1946 to 1952)
 Frank L. Ryerson, arranger & trumpeter (1944)
 Ziggy Talent
 George Robinson, Trombone (1944–1945)
 Andrew (Andy) Bagni, Lead Saxophone (1939–1958)
 Bucky Pizzarelli, Guitar
 Joe Connie, Lead Trombone
 Johnny Watson, Arranger, Baritone Saxophone
 Wedo Marasco, Alto Saxophone
 Red Nichols, Jazz Trumpet
 Mike Shelby, Piano
 Maree Lee, Vocalist (Moonmaids)
 Tinker Cunningham, Vocalist (Moonmaids)
 Babe Feldman, Tenor Saxophone
 Jack Fay, String Bass
 Gerry Bruno, String Bass
 Mary Jo Grogan, (Moonmaids)
 Art Dedrick, Trombone, Arranger
 Ray Conniff, Trombone
 Eddie Julian, Drums
 Benny West, Trumpet
 June Hiett, Moonmaids
 Arnold Ross, Piano
 Don Costa, Arranger
 Marilyn Duke, vocalist
 Betty Norton, Moonmaids
 Arlene Truax, Moonmaids
 Katie Myatt, Moonmaids
 Jerry Bruno, bassist
 Dino DiGiano, Trumpet (1941)
 Bobby Rickey, Drums

Singles

References

External links

 Vaughn Monroe Big Band Era Singer
 Songs Written by Vaughn Monroe (as listed on the Vaughn Monroe Appreciation Society website)
 The Meadows

1911 births
1973 deaths
20th-century American singers
20th-century American male singers
20th-century trumpeters
American bandleaders
American crooners
American male trumpeters
American trumpeters
Big band bandleaders
Bluebird Records artists
Carnegie Mellon University College of Fine Arts alumni
Dot Records artists
Jubilee Records artists
Musicians from Akron, Ohio
Musicians from Pittsburgh
New England Conservatory alumni
People from Westmoreland County, Pennsylvania
RCA Victor artists
Singers from Pennsylvania
Traditional pop music singers